Inishbofin (Inis Bó Finne in Irish, meaning Island of the White Cow) is an island off the coast of Machaire Uí Rabhartaigh (Magheraroarty), County Donegal, Ireland.

Geography

The island is a 120-hectare (300 acre) land mass, with an economy traditionally based on fishing and farming. Irish is spoken routinely. There are no pubs or shops on the island. There is a boat service to and from it but no regular ferry.

It is the largest of a small group of islands; the others, Inis Dúiche and Inis Beag, lie to the north and are uninhabited.

Demographics
Inishbofin's population dropped in 100 years from 166 (1911) to 11 (2011). 

The table reports data taken from Discover the Islands of Ireland (Alex Ritsema, Collins Press, 1999) and the Census of Ireland. Census data in Ireland before 1841 were not complete and/or reliable.

Gallery

See also
 List of islands of Ireland

References

External links
Inishbofin Island - The Island Website with information on the island and its history.
Inis Bó Finne - information from Comhdháil Oileáin na hÉireann
Inishbofin, Donegal - a first-hand account – with photographs – of one American's visit
Historical Map of Inishbofin

Cloughaneely
Gaeltacht places in County Donegal
Islands of County Donegal